Daniel Hernán Rivero (born 12 September 1992) is an Argentine footballer who plays as a forward for River Plate.

References

External links
Hernán Rivero at ascensomx.net 

1992 births
Living people
Argentine footballers
Argentine expatriate footballers
Correcaminos UAT footballers
All Boys footballers
L.D. Alajuelense footballers
Club y Biblioteca Ramón Santamarina footballers
Deportivo Pasto footballers
Sportivo Luqueño players
Club Celaya footballers
Montevideo Wanderers F.C. players
Peñarol players
Club Atlético River Plate (Montevideo) players
Ascenso MX players
Primera Nacional players
Liga FPD players
Categoría Primera A players
Paraguayan Primera División players
Argentine expatriate sportspeople in Mexico
Expatriate footballers in Mexico
Argentine expatriate sportspeople in Costa Rica
Expatriate footballers in Costa Rica
Argentine expatriate sportspeople in Colombia
Expatriate footballers in Colombia
Argentine expatriate sportspeople in Paraguay
Expatriate footballers in Paraguay
Argentine expatriate sportspeople in Uruguay
Expatriate footballers in Uruguay
Association football forwards